Edmund Brown or Browne may refer to:

Pat Brown (Edmund Gerald Brown, Sr., 1905–1996), the 32nd Governor of California
Jerry Brown (Edmund Gerald Brown, Jr., born 1938), Pat Brown's son and the 34th and 39th Governor of California
Edmund Graves Brown (1921–2008), American newspaper executive 
Edmund Browne (born 1937), Irish trade unionist
Edmund John Browne, Baron Browne of Madingley (born 1948), member of the House of Lords and businessman